Shaoyang County is a county in the Province of Hunan, China, it is under the administration of Shaoyang City. Located in the southwest of the province, the county is bordered to the north by Dongkou County, to the west by Huitong and Jingzhou Counties, to the southwest by Tongdao County, to the southeast by Chengbu County, to the east by Wugang City. The county has 12 towns and eight townships under its jurisdiction, the county seat is Fenghuang Community.

Administrative divisions
12 towns
 Baicang
 Changyangpu
 Guzhou
 Huangtingshi
 Jinchengshi
 Jiugongqiao
 Lijiaping
 Tangdukou
 Tangtianshi
 Wufengpu
 Xiahuaqiao
 Yankoupu

8 townships
 Caijiaqiao
 Changle
 Hebo
 Huangjing
 Jinjiang
 Luocheng
 Xiaoxishi
 Zhujiating

Climate

Transportation
Shaoyang West railway station on the Huaihua–Shaoyang–Hengyang railway is located here.

References 
Notes

Sources
www.xzqh.org

External links

 
County-level divisions of Hunan
Shaoyang